Ellerslie Park is an exclusive residential development in the northwestern corner of Port of Spain, Trinidad and Tobago. The development is in the shape of an oval with a single entrance. No two homes are the same, a result of each home being built to the specifications of its original owner. Apart from private homes, Ellerslie Park is also the location of official residencies belonging to senior government officials and foreign diplomats. It is located within walking distance of the Queen's Park Savannah and various hotels and shopping facilities.

Buildings and structures in Port of Spain